Merrick is a station on the Babylon Branch of the Long Island Rail Road. It is officially located on Sunrise Highway, between Hewlett Avenue and Merrick Avenue, in Merrick, New York. However, the parking areas for the station expand well beyond the given location.

History
Merrick station is typical of the elevated Babylon Branch stations that were rebuilt during the mid-to-late 20th century. The station was originally built on October 28, 1867, by the South Side Railroad of Long Island, but in 1869, it was expanded into a hotel built by SSRRLI President Charles Fox. This hotel was burned to the ground in 1908. A second depot was built in 1885 and a third was built in 1902. The station was razed in June 1969 as part of the grade-crossing elimination project. A temporary station was installed on December 4, 1970, but the elevated fourth station was not opened until June 28, 1975.

Station layout
This station has one 12-car-long high-level island platform serving trains in both directions. A 10-car-long awning exists, with the easternmost part of the platform uncovered. The rail line has two tracks at this location. Each Fall, this railroad station, like Bellmore station plays host to a Street Festival/Fair courtesy of Merrick Chamber of Commerce.

Merrick station is home to a memorial to Roxey (d. 1914), a dog who frequented the LIRR in the early 20th century and became a mascot for the commuters and staff. The small gravestone is located on the south side of the station, along the guardrail separating the parking lot from the Sunrise Highway, in a patch of lawn about 20 feet east of Merrick Avenue.

References

External links 

Merrick Station Clock (Merrick Chamber of Commerce)
Merrick Station as seen from Sunrise Highway (Steve Alpert's Roads.net)
 Merrick Avenue entrance from Google Maps Street View
 Station House from Google Maps Street View
 Hewlett Avenue entrance from Google Maps Street View

Long Island Rail Road stations in Nassau County, New York
Railway stations in the United States opened in 1867